Black Thunder may refer to:

Film
 Black Thunder (film), a 1998 action film
 Hawk of the Hills (1927 serial) or Black Thunder, a Western film serial
 Flight of Fury or Black Thunder, a 2007 action film

Other uses
 Black Thunder (chocolate bar), a brand of chocolate cookie bar sold in Japan
 Black Thunder (theme park), a theme park near Coimbatore, India
 Operation Black Thunder, a military operation in India in the 1980s
 Black Thunder Coal Mine, a coal mine in Wyoming
 Black Thunder, a novel by Arna Wendell Bontemps